Josephine Francisca Maria "Fieke" Boekhorst-Van Griensven (born 18 December 1957) is a retired Dutch field hockey player. She won an Olympic gold medal and a European title in 1984, and world titles in 1978 and 1983, but never became a national champion. During her career she played 90 international matches for the Netherlands, in which she scored 106 goals. The defender made her debut for the Dutch on 16 September 1978 in a match against India, and quickly became known for her powerful shots. She retired while preparing for the 1986 World Cup, due to a knee injury sustained during a hockey match, and later worked as a field hockey coach.

References

External links
 

1957 births
Living people
Dutch female field hockey players
Olympic field hockey players of the Netherlands
Field hockey players at the 1984 Summer Olympics
Olympic gold medalists for the Netherlands
Sportspeople from Helmond
Olympic medalists in field hockey
Medalists at the 1984 Summer Olympics
20th-century Dutch women
20th-century Dutch people
21st-century Dutch women